The following are Wikipedia lists related to the United States of America.



Political divisions
Political divisions of the United States
U.S. state
List of states and territories of the United States
List of U.S. state partition proposals
Counties:
List of United States counties and county equivalents
List of counties by U.S. state and territory
List of the most populous counties by U.S. state
List of U.S. states by number of county equivalents

Buildings
Archives and libraries – List of U.S. state libraries and archives
Capitols – List of state and territorial capitols in the United States
Highest buildings – List of tallest buildings by U.S. state and territory
Hospitals – Lists of hospitals in the United States by U.S. state and territory
Museums – List of U.S. state historical societies and museums
Prisons – Lists of state prisons by U.S. state

Demographics
African-American population – List of U.S. states by African-American population
American Human Development Index – List of U.S. states and district by American Human Development Index
Amish population – List of U.S. states by Amish population
Hispanic American population – List of U.S. state, district, and territorial Hispanic and Latino American population
Human Development Index – List of U.S. states by Human Development Index
Irreligion – List of U.S. states, district, and territories by irreligion rate
Latino American population – List of U.S. state, district, and territorial Hispanic and Latino American population
Life expectancy – List of U.S. states and district by life expectancy
Obesity – List of U.S. state and district obesity prevalence
Population – List of U.S. states, district, and territories by population
Population density – List of U.S. states, district, and territories by population density
Population growth rate – List of U.S. states, district, and territories by population growth rate

Economy
Billionaires – List of U.S. states and district by number of billionaires
Budgets – List of U.S. state budgets
Economic growth rate – List of U.S. states by economic growth rate
Federal tax revenue – List of federal tax revenue by U.S. state, district, or territory
Federal taxation and spending – List of U.S. states and district by federal net per capita taxation less spending
Gini coefficient – List of U.S. states and district by Gini coefficient
Gross Domestic Product (GDP) – List of U.S. states and district by Gross Domestic Product
Income – List of U.S. states and district by income 
Income equality – List of U.S. states and district by Gini coefficient
Income tax – List of U.S. states with a flat rate individual income tax
Income tax – List of U.S. states with no individual income tax
Median household income – List of U.S. states and district by median household income
Minimum wages – List of U.S. state, district, and territorial minimum wages
Per capita income – List of U.S. states and district by per capita income
Per capita personal income - List of states by adjusted per capita personal income
Poverty rate – List of U.S. states and district by poverty rate
Sales taxes – List of U.S. state, district, and territorial sales taxes

Geography and cities
Area – List of U.S. states and territories by area
Capitals – List of U.S. state capitals
Historical capitals – List of historical U.S. state, colonial, and territorial capitals
Cities – List of largest cities of U.S. states and territories by population
Coastline – List of U.S. states and territories by coastline
Elevation – List of U.S. states and territories by elevation
Time offsets – List of time offsets by U.S. state and territory

Governance and laws
Abortion law – List of U.S. state abortion law
Admission to the Union
Age of consent law – List of U.S. state and district age of consent law
Alcohol law – List of U.S. state or district alcohol law
Alford plea – List of Alford plea legal status by U.S. state
Attorneys general – List of current U.S. state attorneys general
Constitutions – List of U.S. state, district, and territorial constitutions
Governors – List of current United States governors
Gun law – List of U.S. state or district gun law
Law enforcement agencies – List of U.S. state and district law enforcement agency lists
Legal codes – List of U.S. state, district, and territorial legal codes
Legislators – List of current U.S. state legislators
Legislatures – List of United States state legislatures
Lieutenant governors – List of current United States lieutenant governors
Same-sex union and marriage:
Constitutional bans on same-sex unions – List of U.S. state constitutional amendments banning same-sex unions by type
Same-sex marriage laws – List of U.S. state and district same-sex marriage law
Same-sex union laws – List of U.S. state and district same-sex union law
Self-representation – List of U.S. state and district constitutional provisions allowing self-representation in courts
Smoking law – List of U.S. state, district, and territorial tobacco smoking law
Statewide elected officials – List of U.S. statewide elected officials
Treasurers – List of current U.S. state treasurers

History
Date of admission – List of U.S. states by date of admission to the Union
Historical capitals – List of historical U.S. state, colonial, and territorial capitals
Historical societies and museums – List of U.S. state historical societies and museums
Preceding entities – included in List of U.S. states by date of admission to the Union

Names and languages
Demonyms – List of U.S. state and district demonyms
Language – List of U.S. state, district, and territorial language status
English language – List of U.S. state, district, and territorial language status
Spanish language – List of U.S. state, district, and territorial Spanish language use
Names and pronunciation – List of U.S. states
Name etymologies – List of U.S. state name etymologies
Nicknames – List of U.S. state, district, and territorial nicknames

State symbols

Other
Carbon dioxide emissions – List of U.S. states and district by carbon dioxide emissions
Codes and abbreviations – List of U.S. state and territory abbreviations
ISO 3166-2 codes – ISO 3166-2:US
Educational attainment – Lists of U.S. states and district by educational attainment
Fertility rate – List of U.S. states, district, and territories by total fertility rate
Gun homicide – List of U.S. states by gun homicide rate
Incarceration rate – List of U.S. states by incarceration rate
Labor union affiliation – List of U.S. states and district by labor union affiliation rate
License plates – List of U.S. state, district, and territorial motor vehicle license plates
Motor vehicles – List of U.S. states and district by motor vehicle registrations per capita
National Historic Landmarks – List of U.S. state, district, and territorial National Historic Landmark lists
Parks – List of U.S. state park lists
Poets laureate – List of U.S. state and district poets laureate
Renewable energy – List of U.S. states by renewable portion of electric energy generation
Superfund sites – List of U.S. state, district, and territorial Superfund site lists
Unemployment rate – List of U.S. states and district by unemployment rate
Wilderness areas – List of U.S. state and tribal wilderness areas

See also
Wikipedia U.S. state articles, portals, and WikiProjects – Wikipedia:List of U.S. state portals

External links

Information about All States from UCB Libraries GovPubs
State Resource Guides, from the Library of Congress
Tables with areas, populations, densities and more (in order of population)
Tables with areas, populations, densities and more (alphabetical)
State and Territorial Governments on USA.gov
StateMaster – statistical database for US States.
U.S. States: Comparisons, rankings, demographics